The 1970 United States elections were held on November 3, and elected the members of the 92nd United States Congress. The election took place during the Vietnam War, in the middle of Republican President Richard Nixon's first term. Nixon and Vice President Spiro Agnew campaigned heavily for Republican candidates, with Nixon encouraging voters to respond to anti-war and civil rights activists by voting the Republican ticket. In an October speech he declared, "My friends, I say that the answer to those that engage in disruption--to those that shout their filthy slogans, to those that try to shout down speakers--is not to answer in kind, but go to the polls on election day, and in the quiet of that ballot box, stand up and be counted: the great silent majority of America." Despite these White House efforts, the Democratic Party retained its Senate majority and increased its majority in the House.

In the House of Representatives, the Democrats picked up twelve seats at the expense of the Republican Party. In the Senate, Republicans picked up two seats, and James L. Buckley won the election as a member of the Conservative Party of New York. He is the most recent individual to win election to the Senate as a member of a third party and remain affiliated with that party after the election.

President Nixon was popular during the midterms, but what attributed to Democratic success is that some of Nixon's supporters were Democrats or Democratic-leaning voters who didn't vote for the Democratic Party's 1968 presidential nominee, Vice President Hubert Humphrey, who went on to win election to the Senate in Minnesota in this midterm after he lost to Nixon in the 1968 United States presidential election, and another part of Nixon's base wasn't politically engaged as tends to happen with a President's base during midterm elections, and there was frustration with the direction of the Vietnam War under the Nixon administration, Nixon promised to end the war in his run for the Presidency in 1968, but his strategy to do so, Vietnamization, was going slowly than expected and Nixon sent U.S. troops to invade Cambodia, making the war in Vietnam worse and domestically, it resulted in the Kent State massacre, which saw the Ohio Army National Guard shooting unarmed Kent State University students who protested against the war. 

This was the first time that Republicans gained Senate seats while losing House seats in a midterm, which also later occurred in 2018. Democrats did this in 1914, 1962, and 2022 as well. 

This election saw future president Jimmy Carter win the election to the governorship in Georgia.

See also
1970 United States House of Representatives elections
1970 United States Senate elections
1970 United States gubernatorial elections

References

 
1970
United States midterm elections
November 1970 events in the United States